Thomas "Trooper" Washington (April 21, 1944 – November 19, 2004) was an American professional basketball player born and raised in Philadelphia.

A 6'7" forward from Cheyney University of Pennsylvania, Washington was drafted in 1967 in the 5th round by the Cincinnati Royals, but he played instead in the American Basketball Association from 1967 to 1973 as a member of the Pittsburgh / Minnesota Pipers, Los Angeles Stars, The Floridians, and New York Nets. He won the 1968 ABA Championship with the Pittsburgh Pipers and appeared in the 1969 ABA All-Star Game. In his ABA career, Washington averaged 10.6 points per game and 10.0 rebounds per game.

Washington died suddenly while coaching his first game as head coach of the Pennsylvania Pit Bulls, a team in a league also called the American Basketball Association.

References

1944 births
2004 deaths
American men's basketball players
Cheyney Wolves men's basketball players
Cincinnati Royals draft picks
Los Angeles Stars players
Miami Floridians players
Minnesota Pipers players
New York Nets players
Pittsburgh Pipers players
Centers (basketball)
Power forwards (basketball)
Basketball players from Philadelphia